Merigan, New South Wales is a civil parish of Murray County, New South Wales.

The  parish is on the Mulwaree River a few miles south of Tarago. It lies on the Bombala railway line and includes most of the locality of Mount Fairy.

References

Queanbeyan–Palerang Regional Council
Goulburn Mulwaree Council
Parishes of Murray County